Lucien Fliffel (born 12 November 1931) is a French racing cyclist. He rode in the 1956 Tour de France. His father Embareck Fliffel "Flifel Ben Otsmane El Hammani Ben Mebarek" (1901-1992) was also a professional cyclist.

References

1931 births
Living people
French male cyclists
Place of birth missing (living people)